CUMYL-4CN-BINACA (also known as CUMYL-CYBINACA or SGT-78) is an indazole-3-carboxamide based synthetic cannabinoid that has been sold online as a designer drug. It is a potent agonist for cannabinoid receptors CB1 and CB2, with in vitro EC50 values of 0.58 nM and 6.12 nM, respectively. In mice, CUMYL-4CN-BINACA produces hypothermic and pro-convulsant effects via the CB1 receptor, and anecdotal reports suggest it has an active dose of around 0.1 mg in humans.

CUMYL-4CN-BINACA is metabolized to produce cyanide, raising concerns about liver toxicity. There is one reported case of hyperthermia, rhabdomyolysis, and kidney failure associated with its use.

See also 
 4CN-AMB-BUTINACA
 5F-CUMYL-PINACA
 5F-SDB-006
 ADAMANTYL-THPINACA
 CUMYL-PICA
 CUMYL-PINACA
 CUMYL-THPINACA
 SDB-006
 NNE1

References 

Cannabinoids
Designer drugs
Indazolecarboxamides